Mississippi's 8th congressional district existed from 1903 to 1933. It was created after the 1900 census and abolished following the 1930 census.

Boundaries
The 8th congressional district boundaries included all of Hinds, Madison, Rankin, Warren, and Yazoo County. It also included the southern portion of modern Humphreys County (included as part of Yazoo County at that time).

List of members representing the district

References

 Congressional Biographical Directory of the United States 1774–present

08
Former congressional districts of the United States
1903 establishments in Mississippi
1933 disestablishments in Mississippi
Constituencies established in 1903
Constituencies disestablished in 1933